More than 30,000 public-school teachers of the Los Angeles Unified School District (LAUSD) went on strike from January 14 to 22, 2019. Protesting low pay, large class sizes, inadequate support staffs of nurses and librarians, and the proliferation of charter schools, the teachers went on strike for the first time in the district in 30 years. The strike was authorized by United Teachers Los Angeles (UTLA).

In August 2018, under the leadership of progressive UTLA President Alex Caputo-Pearl, 98% of UTLA members authorized a strike following months of contract negotiation disputes. Though teachers were also striking to highlight issues like demands for pay raises, public discussion became predominantly focused on the union's opposition to charter schools. Though one in five LAUSD students attended a charter school at the time of the strike, UTLA argued that largely highly-performing charter schools were siphoning money from underperforming unionized schools.

A fact-finding report failed to resolve matters and UTLA stated that a strike would proceed on January 10, 2019. The school district attempted to stop the strike on legal grounds, but a judge allowed it to proceed. 30,000 teachers walked out of class and onto the picket line in what became the first such strike in Los Angeles in thirty years, which would last six days. Following the six days of crowded rallies, UTLA and the school district reached a deal on a new contract on January 22, 2019, which included teacher pay raises, full-time librarians for middle and high schools, a commitment to provide full-time nurses for every school, and the establishment of thirty "community schools" in the model of Austin, Texas and Cincinnati, though UTLA failed to impose a binding cap on charter schools.

References 

Teachers' strike
2019 labor disputes and strikes
2019 strike
Education labor disputes in the United States
January 2019 events in the United States
2018 strike